Haqqabad or Haqabad may refer to:
 Haqqabad, Razavi Khorasan
 Haqabad, Sistan and Baluchestan
 Haqqabad, Gowhar Kuh, Sistan and Baluchestan